The Tyler WildCatters were a minor league baseball team located in Tyler, Texas.  The team, which existed from 1994 to 1997, played in the independent Texas–Louisiana League, and was un-affiliated with any major league baseball team.  Their home stadium was historic Mike Carter Field, which has been home to various professional, semi-professional, and collegiate Baseball teams dating back to 1941.  Their offices were located at 414 South Bonner Avenue in the historic Brick Streets District of Tyler, Texas.

Notable WildCatters
Greg Brummett – Played for the WildCatters in 1996; made a brief appearance in 1993 with the Minnesota Twins and San Francisco Giants.
Larry Carter – Played for the WildCatters in 1994; The only WildCatter to throw a no-hitter (a 4-0 Tyler victory on June 21, 1994 against the Beaumont Bullfrogs); served as WildCatters' pitching coach for all four seasons of the team's existence; played for the San Francisco Giants in 1992.
Sean Collins – Played for the WildCatters from 1995–1997; the WildCatters' all-time leader in runs (176), triples (12) and stolen bases (82); played seven seasons of professional Baseball (1989–1990, 1994–1998) -- peaking at the Double-A level with the Tulsa Drillers in 1998; appeared in the 1991 movie Talent for the Game, starring Edward James Olmos and Lorraine Bracco.
Darrell Evans – Managed the WildCatters in 1997; played a 19-year major league career from 1969 to 1988 with the Atlanta Braves, San Francisco Giants, and Detroit Tigers.
Dave Hilton – Managed the WildCatters in 1996; played a four-year major league career with the San Diego Padres beginning in 1972.
Jessie Hollins – Played for the WildCatters in 1997; appeared with the Chicago Cubs in 1992.
Billy Johnson – Played for the WildCatters in 1994 and 1996; the WildCatters' all-time pitching leader in victories (17), strikeouts (182) and innings pitched (234.2); played six seasons of professional Baseball (1989–1992, 1994, 1996) -- peaking at the Class A level with the Charleston Wheelers (1990–1991) and the Waterloo Diamonds in 1992.
Wayne Krenchicki – Managed the WildCatters in 1995; played in the majors from 1979–1986 with the Baltimore Orioles, Cincinnati Reds, Detroit Tigers, and Montreal Expos.
Ken Patterson – Played for the WildCatters in 1996; played a six-year major league career from 1988 to 1994 with the Chicago White Sox, Chicago Cubs and California Angels.
Todd Rizzo – Played for the WildCatters in 1994; played for the Chicago White Sox from 1998–1999.
Ken Shamburg – Played for the WildCatters from 1994–1996; the WildCatters' all-time leader in games played (286), at-bats (1,061), hits (317), doubles (82), home runs (45), runs batted in (192) and walks (134); played eleven seasons of professional Baseball (1989–1999) -- peaking at the Triple-A level with the Rochester Red Wings for portions of the 1990–1992 seasons and with the Denver Zephyrs in 1992.
Bill Stein – Managed the WildCatters in 1994; played a 13-year career beginning in 1972 with the St. Louis Cardinals, Chicago White Sox, Seattle Mariners, and Texas Rangers.

Yearly Records

All-Time WildCatters Player Register

James Baldridge, RHP (1994)
Rob Batchler, RHP (1995–1996)
Michael Benavidez, RHP (1997)
Joe Bertucci, UTL (1995)
Britton Bonneau, 2B-SS (1994)
Luther Bowen, RHP (1997)
John Bowles, 1B-3B (1996)
Jeff Brown, LHP (1994)
Greg Brummett, RHP (1996)
Ron Caridad, RHP (1997)
Larry Carter, RHP (1994)
Tommy Carter, LHP (1996)
Chris Cassels, 1B-3B-DH (1997) 
Ramon Cedeno, OF (1997)
Matt Cesare, SS (1994)
John Codrington, RHP (1997)
Billy Coleman, RHP (1997)
Sean Collins, OF-2B (1995–1997)
Troy Conkle, SS-RHP (1994–1996) 
Jim Cooney, C-1B (1996)
James Craver, OF (1994)
Derek Dana, C (1994–1995)
Ray Davis, RHP (1997)
Danny DiPace, OF-3B (1997)
Sean Doran, RHP (1994)
Steve Emmons, 1B (1997)
Cody Farr, LHP (1994–1995)
Jason Farrow, RHP (1997)
Rich Faulks, LHP (1994)
Eric Ford, 2B-3B (1995)
Gary Frank, 2B (1997)
Cory Gafford, C (1997)
Javier Gomez, RHP (1997)
Clay Gould, OF (1994–1995)
Rafael Guerrero, OF-1B (1997)
Lincoln Gumbs, UTL (1997)
Chris Hancock, LHP (1995–1996)
Richie Hare, OF (1996)
James Harris, 3B (1994–1995)
Kelly Hartman, LHP (1997)
Tim Haugh, LHP (1994–1995)
Derek Henderson, 3B (1996–1997)
Erin Higgins, LHP (1996)
Jessie Hollins, RHP (1997)
Rod Huffman, RHP (1994)
Todd Ingram, RHP (1996)
Ray Jackson, OF (1994) 
Billy Johnson, RHP (1994, 1996)
Jack Johnson, C (1997)
Brett Jones, RHP (1994–1995)
Rich Kelley, LHP (1995)
Ron Kitchen, RHP (1996–1997) 
Josef Klam, C (1996)
Kerry Knox, LHP (1995, 1997)
Tom Koerick, C (1996)
Damian Leyva, LHP (1994)
Steve Long, RHP (1996)
Steve Maddock, RHP (1997)
Aaron Martin, LHP (1997)
Jerry Martin, RHP (1997)
Paul Meador, LHP (1995–1996)
Mark Mesewicz, LHP (1996)
Troy Mooney, RHP (1994)
Jeff Motes, 2B-SS (1996)
Jason Motley, 1B (1996)
Billy Norcross, 1B (1994–1995)
Joe Norris, RHP (1997)
Clemente Núñez, RHP (1997)
Steve Ortiz, LHP (1997)
Ken Patterson, LHP-DH (1996)
Steve Peck, RHP (1995)
Carlos Perez, 1B-OF (1996–1997)
Sandy Pichardo, 2B-SS (1997)
Dan Popple, RHP (1995)
Joe Porcelli, LHP (1994)
Dan Rambo, RHP (1995)
Zach Randle, 2B-SS (1995)
Ronnie Rantz, LHP (1995)
O.J. Rhone, OF (1995)
Tony Rich, 2B (1996)
Elvin Rivera, RHP (1995)
Todd Rizzo, LHP (1994)
Chris Rusciano, RHP (1996)
Fabian Salmon, RHP (1995)
Todd Samples, OF (1995)
Tom Schneider, LHP (1995)
Ken Shamburg, OF-1B (1994–1996)
John Simmons, LHP (1996)
Alex Slattery, RHP (1996)
Jason Smiga, SS (1996–1997)
Joel Smith, C (1994) 
Karl Stanley, RHP (1994)
Earl Steinmetz, RHP (1997)
Terry Tewell, C (1995)
Matt Torres, C (1994)
John Turner, 2B-3B (1994–1995)
Rocky Turner, OF (1996)
Mark Tuttle, RHP (1995)
Colby Weaver, C (1996)
Brian Williams, RHP (1996)
Lanny Williams, UTL (1994–1996)
Doug Wollenburg, 2B (1996)
Pat Woodruff, OF (1994–1995)

References

Defunct minor league baseball teams
Sports in Tyler, Texas
Baseball teams disestablished in 1997
Defunct baseball teams in Texas
Defunct independent baseball league teams
Professional baseball teams in Texas
Baseball teams established in 1994
1994 establishments in Texas
1997 disestablishments in Texas